Esquel is a town in the northwest of Chubut Province in Argentine Patagonia. It is located in Futaleufú Department, of which it is the government seat. The town's name derives from one of two Tehuelche words: one meaning "marsh" and the other  meaning "land of burrs", which refers to the many thorny plants including the pimpinella, and the other meaning herbaceous plants whose fruits, when ripe, turn into prickly burrs that stick to the animals' skins and wool or people's clothes as a way of propagation.

History
The founding of the town dates back to the arrival of Welsh immigrants in Chubut in 1865. The settlement was created on 25 February 1906, as an extension of the Colonia 16 de Octubre, that also contains the town of Trevelin.

The city, the main town of the area, is located by the Esquel Stream and surrounded by the mountains La Zeta, La Cruz, Cerro 21 and La Hoya. La Hoya is known as a ski resort with good quality snow right through the spring.

At  in length, it is said to be the only narrow-gauge long-distance line in operation and the southernmost railway in the world. The first fifty oil-fired steam locomotives were made by Henschel & Son of Germany in 1922. Later twenty-five locomotives were bought from the Baldwin Locomotive Works of Philadelphia. 

The train remains authentic and in operation thanks to the effort of the team of workers at Talleres Ferroviarios El Maiten, that make several parts by hand. Trains now run as a tourist excursion between Esquel and the small settlement of Nahuel Pan, located at the foot of the volcano of the same name, with other services all the way to El Maitén. Until 1993, the train ran all the way to the city of Ingeniero Jacobacci in Río Negro Province, from where trains ran to Viedma, Río Negro and from there to Buenos Aires, forming the General Roca railway.

It has wide cement streets with sidewalks, and is clean and well maintained. Their hospital is the primary one for the zone and is often a destination for "Medical Tourism" from both foreigners and Porteños (residents of Buenos Aires) alike.

In 2003 a mining referendum was held in Esquel with 81% of voters, with a participation rate of 75%, rejected the establishment a mining project by Median Gold. The mine was estimated to create 1,500 jobs during ten years.

In May 2009, Esquel was twinned with Aberystwyth in Wales; with representatives of the Welsh town traveling to Argentina to participate in the signing of a charter formalising the link.

Esquel meteorite

In 1951 a farmer found a  meteorite, later called Esquel, while digging a hole for a water tank. When cut and polished, the meteorite showed beautiful yellowish olivine (peridot) crystals. The Esquel meteorite is known worldwide among collectors and the scientific community.

Climate
Owing to its location on the immediate leeward side of the Andes, Esquel has a cool summer Mediterranean climate (Köppen Csb) bordering on a Humid continental climate (Köppen Dsb). Other climate systems, such as the Trewartha climate classification, place it within the oceanic zone (Do), like much of Western Europe and the Pacific Northwest. Temperatures are relatively cold for its climate due to its higher altitude. Summers are mild with warm temperatures during the afternoon followed by cool nights. It's the sunniest season, averaging as much as 10 hours of sunshine per day in January with an average of 7–8 clear days and only 5-7 overcast days. Spring and fall are transition seasons featuring mild temperatures during the day and cool to cold nights. Spring starts out with cool temperatures during the day and very cold nights which progressively becomes warmer. Both spring and fall have highly variable weather. 

Winters vary from cool to cold with mean temperatures close to freezing while precipitation is high. Temperatures regularly fall below freezing during the winter nights. Winters are characterized by cloudy weather, averaging 11-13 overcast days from June to August. The average date of the first frost occurs on March 7 while the average date of the last frost occurs on November 10 although frosts have been recorded in all months.

The average relative humidity is 62%, ranging from a high of 77% in June and July to a low of 49% in January. Summers have lower humidity due to higher temperatures. Most of the wind comes from the west or the southwest with calm days being uncommon. The relief modifies the wind speeds with southern areas receiving more wind than the north. Esquel receives an average annual precipitation of  a year; much of it being concentrated in the winter months. It is estimated that Esquel receives an average of 7 hours of sunshine per day, ranging from a high of 10 hours in January to a low of 5 hours in July.

See also

Old Patagonian Express

References

Notes

Books

External links

 Project-Hiraeth – Documents the stories of the Welsh colony in Patagonia, Argentina through film, text and illustration.
 
 News tourism information, photographs
 Municipality of Esquel - General, government and tourism information (in English and Spanish).
 La Trochita

Populated places in Chubut Province
Populated places established in 1906
Tourism in Argentina
Welsh settlement in Patagonia
Cities in Argentina
1906 establishments in Argentina
Argentina